Lightray (Solis) is a DC Comics superhero. Created by Jack Kirby for the Jack Kirby's Fourth World meta-series, he first appeared in New Gods #1 (February 1971). Lightray was a major character in New Gods volume 1 (1971–1978), as well as volume 2 (1984), volume 3 (1989–1991) and volume 4 (1995–1997). He has also appeared with Orion in the Cosmic Odyssey limited series (1988–1989), Jack Kirby's Fourth World (1997–1998) and Orion (2000–2002).

Seven years after the character's creation, Lightray's origin story was revealed in DC Special Series #10, a Secret Origins of Super-Heroes issue that was published in January 1978.

The version of the character in current DC continuity was introduced in Green Lantern/New Gods: Godhead #1 in December 2014.

Characterization
For the fourth volume of New Gods created by in 1995, Rachel Pollack and Tom Peyer discussed with Back Issue magazine how Lightray changed after Darkseid is killed by Orion in issue #2:

Walt Simonson, who wrote the Orion series starting in 2000, says that his conception of Lightray and Orion was based on the relationship that Kirby established in New Gods volume 1. In 2018, Simonson said: "I saw Lightray as a strategist, whereas Orion is more a tactician. Jack actually had Orion refer to Lightray as a planner at the climax of the Deep Six story, "The Glory Boat!" (New Gods #6, Jan. 1972). I tried basing my notions of Lightray primarily on that story".

In Superheroes of the Round Table, Jason Tondro characterizes Lightray's place in Kirby's New Gods work: "We have characters like... the amazing Lightray, a denizen of New Genesis who embodies light with all of its creativity, bright humor, and intelligence... Lightray embodies illumination". Tondro says Lightray "and other characters, both good and evil, hint at the full dimensions of Kirby's epic pantheon".

Fictional character biography
Lightray is the shining star of New Genesis and a high-spirited New God. Unlike his grim friend Orion, Lightray is cheerful and optimistic and prefers to solve problems through compromise rather than combat. He uses the speed of light to his advantage in eluding foes.

Lightray has served one stint as a member of the Justice League. He joined the international branch along with Orion on the same night as a membership drive failed to find other new recruits. The difference between the two was illustrated in battle. While Lightray desires a minimum of fuss in battle by dispatching his foe Crowbar with a simple expenditure of energy to the man's face, Orion preferred to destroy the pavement around Blackrock, only to then be angered when his opponent surrendered instead of fighting to the death.

In this same issue, Lightray demonstrates his knowledge of chess. Lightray's long hair causes him to be mistaken for a girl by the old-fashioned General Glory. They stay with the team until just after the battle with General Glory's old foe the Evil Eye.

As Solis his idea of fun is protecting New Genesis from Apokolips, Darkseid, and his minions. He resides on New Genesis and is active in adventuring. He returns to Earth briefly in JLA #27 (March 1999), as part of an emergency expansion of the Justice League. The team battles the android Amazo in the Florida Everglades. Most of them are subdued and their powers copied, Lightray included. Amazo loses his powers when Superman, as the chairman, officially disbands the League, thus ending Lightray's membership.

He would appear again to aid the League alongside Orion and Big Barda when the planet Qward attacked Earth with a giant ship.

In Countdown #48, Lightray falls to Earth after an off stage fight with the New Gods Killer (later revealed to be Infinity-Man). He dies holding Jimmy Olsen's hand, repeating the word "infinite" and glowing brighter.

In Final Crisis #7, Lightray is depicted standing alongside Barda and Mister Miracle following the reincarnation of New Genesis on the ruins of Apokolips.

Powers and abilities
Like all the New Gods, Lightray is functionally immortal and possesses great superhuman strength, endurance and reflexes. Lightray is able to lift several tons with ease. His reflexes and durability are also more than amazing and he has a limited degree of invulnerability. Lightray flies at the speed of light or even faster, and can generate and project solar energy. Thus, he can create brilliant light and extraordinarily high levels of heat. He can focus his solar energy into beams of laser-like intensity. Lightray can also use his powers of light to create life-like illusions.
Using his power to the maximum, he can generate a huge sun or a nova explosion. Although Lightray has a pacifist personality and isn't a highly experienced warrior, he is well trained in hand-to-hand combat, but he prefers to use his solar powers in battle. In his headgear Lightray carries one of the powerful "living computers" called Mother Box.

Alternate versions

Seven Soldiers of Victory
Lightray makes several brief, non-speaking appearances in Grant Morrison's Seven Soldiers of Victory series, where his human form is a frail man on crutches.

Captain Carrot
In the miniseries Captain Carrot and the Final Ark, Lightray's counterpart in the "New Dogs" is an anthropomorphic dog named Lightstray.

JLA: The Nail
In the 1998 Elseworlds JLA: The Nail, Lightray is depicted fighting in a war between New Genesis and Apokolips.

Influence
Jack Kirby's 1971 design for Lightray's costume influenced the look of artist Al Milgrom's creation of Firestorm in 1978. In an interview from 2019, Milgrom admitted: "The facemask on Firestorm, the way it comes around the chin, was probably inspired by Lightray more than anything... I liked the [Lightray] head-covering thing; I said, "I'm stealin' it!"

A July 1971 New Gods story featuring Lightray has been noted as an example of racial bias in 1970s superhero storytelling. In "Death and the Black Racer" (New Gods #3), Lightray — a blond white man — is running desperately to escape the Black Racer, portrayed as a person of color. José Alaniz and Scott T. Smith noted in Uncanny Bodies: Superhero Comics and Disability that the story "suggests a racial dichotomy... in which blackness presents as a threatening force".

In other media

Television
 Lightray appears in the shows set in the DC Animated Universe:
 Lightray appears in a non-speaking cameo in the Superman: The Animated Series episode "Legacy".
 Lightray appears in the two-part Justice League episode "Twilight", voiced by Rob Paulsen. Batman and Wonder Woman meet him after arriving on New Genesis, and he later accompanies them and Orion in meeting with Highfather.
 Lightray returns in a non-speaking role in the Justice League Unlimited episode "Destroyer". He encounters Lex Luthor, Sinestro and the Secret Society near New Genesis after they have accidentally resurrected Darkseid, who destroyed their base, only to be attacked by Evil Star and have his Mother Box stolen by Luthor, which the villains use to return to Earth. His fate afterwards is unknown.
 Lightray was originally planned to appear in the Harley Quinn episode "Inner (Para) Demons" where Darkseid killed him for his incompetence, but DC Comics objected to the death and Lightray's cameo was replaced by Forager.
 Lightray appears in Young Justice, voiced by Nolan North.

Film
 An alternate universe version of Lightray appears in Justice League: Gods and Monsters, voiced by Trevor Devall. He partakes in Darkseid's betrayal and is murdered by Bekka when he attacks her.

References

DC Comics characters with superhuman strength
DC Comics deities
DC Comics superheroes
Comics characters introduced in 1971
DC Comics characters who can move at superhuman speeds
Fictional characters who can manipulate light
Characters created by Jack Kirby
Fourth World (comics)